The Bangladeshi national cricket team toured Kenya in August 2006. They played 3 One Day Internationals. Bangladesh won the series 3-0.

Bangladesh were originally scheduled to play three One Day International matches between 19 July and 23 July. However, the Kenyan board had to postpone the matches for three weeks due to lack of funds.

Squads

LOI series summary

1st ODI

2nd ODI

3rd ODI

External links
 Cricinfo
 CricketArchive itinerary

References

2006 in Bangladeshi cricket
2006 in Kenyan cricket
2006
International cricket competitions in 2006
Kenyan cricket seasons from 2000–01